The WFI – Ingolstadt School of Management (or WFI Ingolstadt) is a leading German business school and the faculty of business administration and economics of the Catholic University of Eichstätt-Ingolstadt. The WFI (meaning "Wirtschaftswissenschaftliche Fakultät Ingolstadt" ) is one of Germany's foremost business schools and the modern successor of Bavaria's first university, i.e. the ancient University of Ingolstadt. It is also Germany's only catholic business school and specifically marked with compulsory courses in economic and business ethics and an obligatory choice of a foreign commercial language course.

History

From 1472 to 1800 the University of Ingolstadt had its seat in Ingolstadt before it moved to Landshut and later to Munich and is still existing as the Ludwig Maximilian University of Munich.
In the early 1980s, in order to continue the city's tradition of higher education combined with the ambitions of the Catholic University of Eichstaett to diversify the offered portfolio of courses, the city and the University started negotiations about the establishment of a faculty of economics on a second campus of the University in Ingolstadt. The negotiations culminated in the start of teaching in the autumn of 1989 at the new founded business faculty which from then on made public appearance as WFI - Ingolstadt School of Management.
 The main cluster of campus buildings of the faculty, including the library (which is a European Documentation Centre) and the big lecture hall, were in former times a monastery of the Divine Word Missionaries, but it was soon to small for the increasing numbers of students. Therefore the decision was made to expand the existing faculty with a new building on campus, which was finished in 1995, when already around 750 students were enrolled at the WFI.
In 1997 the first chair of Service Management in Germany was introduced at the WFI – Ingolstadt School of Management.

Reputation

The WFI has a reputation of being one of the best academic institutions for management education in Germany as its corporate relations and major rankings (9th nationally, 2nd in Bavaria) confirm.

Selection process

Since 1996 the WFI uses a double-stage selection process for university applicants in order to assess their potential. Applicants are preselected on the basis of their academic and personal achievements as well as their extracurricular activities and social commitment. During an interview day potential students have to put their intellectual skills to the test and are asked to explain their motivation to become a part of the WFI academic community. This takes place in front of a jury of professors, research fellows and further members of the school.

Degree programmes

The WFI offers the following degree programmes:
 Bachelor of Science (B.Sc.) in Business Administration (three-year-programme offering nine areas of specialisation).
 Bachelor of Science (B.Sc.) and Bachelor of Business Management (BBM) in International Business Administration (four-year-programme leading to a German-Chinese double degree) in cooperation with the Tongji University (Shanghai) and the Sun Yat-sen University (Guangzhou).
 Master of Science (M.Sc.) in Business Administration (two-year-programme with specialisations in the areas of Management, Finance and Management Science).
 Master of Science (M.Sc.) in International Business Administration (two-year-programme leading to a German-French double degree) in cooperation with ESC Toulouse.
 Master of Business Administration (M.B.A.).
 Doctoral programmes leading to the German PhD equivalent Dr. rer. pol.

International partner universities

As internationality is one of the major aspirations of the WFI – Ingolstadt School of Management, it has own partner universities in addition to the partners of the Catholic University of Eichstätt-Ingolstadt. A small selection:

References

External links
 Official School Website

Business schools in Germany
Ingolstadt